Sang-e-Meel Publications is a Lahore-based publishing house that was established in 1962 in Pakistan. It has to its credit of being the foremost publisher of Urdu books after the partition of India in 1947. Apart from publishing numerous new titles, it is also credited with publication of old Urdu titles and classic and rare books.

It has to its credit the publication of books of famous writers like: Ashfaq Ahmed, Faiz Ahmed Faiz, Raza Ali Abidi, Mustansar Hussain Tarar, Saadat Hasan Manto, Razia Butt, Intizar Hussain, Qudratullah Shahab, Mirza Azeem Baig Chughtai, Qurat-ul-Ain Haider and many more.

See also
 Ferozsons
 List of Urdu language book publishing companies

References

External links
 
 Location and contact info in Lahore, Pakistan

Book publishing companies of Pakistan
Companies based in Lahore
1962 establishments in Pakistan
Publishing companies established in 1962
Mass media in Lahore
Publishing companies of Pakistan